The Our Lady of the Hour Church (Église Notre-Dame de l'Heure ) also known as the name of the Latin Church, was a Catholic church in the center of Mosul, in northern Iraq. Built in the 1870s by the Dominican Fathers, it was especially famous for its bell donated by the Empress Eugenia de Montijo, for which it was sometimes called the Clock Church. It was damaged in a 2006 bombing.

History
In 1860, after the massacre of Damascus, during which were killed between 4,000 and 6,000 Christians, Napoleon III sent an expeditionary force to the Levant to help Eastern Christians. A decade later, the Dominicans created in Mosul the Convent of Our Lady of the Hour. In 1880, the Empress Eugenie donated her watch. That was when the first tower was installed on Iraqi soil. In the courtyard of the church it was built as a replica of the Lourdes grotto with a statue of Our Lady of Miracles, where the faithful come to pray.

In 2006, the church was partially destroyed in a bombing during the Iraq War. In the summer of 2014, Christians in the Nineveh Plain fell into the hands of the Islamic State. Most of the forty-five churches were destroyed, converted into mosques or prisons. On April 24, 2016, it was reported that the Latin Church was destroyed by terrorists after looting antiquities and works of art. Later reports indicated the clock tower was actually still standing.

See also 

Roman Catholicism in Iraq
Destruction of cultural heritage by ISIL

References

Churches in Mosul
Buildings and structures destroyed by ISIL
Churches destroyed by Muslims
Destroyed churches in Iraq
Roman Catholic churches completed in 1880
Roman Catholic churches in Iraq
Buildings and structures demolished in 2016
Christianity in Mosul
19th-century Roman Catholic church buildings